Martín Vassallo Argüello was the defending champion; however, he chose to not defend this 2009 title.
1st seed Eduardo Schwank won in the final match 7–5, 6–4, against Jorge Aguilar.

Seeds

Draw

Finals

Top half

Bottom half

External links
Main Draw
Qualifying Draw

Lima Challenger
2009 Singles